William Charlton (October 11, 1831 – May 24, 1908) was an American politician and farmer.

Charlton was born in County Armagh, Ireland. In 1843, Charlton emigrated to the United States and eventually settled in Verona, Wisconsin Territory in 1847. He was a farmer and studied law but never practiced law. During the American Civil War, Charlton served in the 11th Wisconsin Volunteer Infantry Regiment and was commissioned captain. In 1865, Charlton was elected county treasurer for Dane County, Wisconsin and was a Republican. In 1866, Charlton served in the Wisconsin Assembly. In 1867, Charlton moved to Madison, Wisconsin. He served on the Dane County Board of Supervisors and was chairman of the Verona Town Board. In 1876, Charlton served in the Wisconsin Assembly and was a Liberal Republican. He served as sheriff of Dane County in 1877 and 1878. Charlton died at his home in Madison, Wisconsin.

Notes

External links

1831 births
1908 deaths
Irish emigrants to the United States (before 1923)
People from County Armagh
Politicians from Madison, Wisconsin
People of Wisconsin in the American Civil War
Farmers from Wisconsin
Wisconsin Liberal Republicans
County officials in Wisconsin
Wisconsin sheriffs
County supervisors in Wisconsin
Mayors of places in Wisconsin
People from Verona, Wisconsin
Republican Party members of the Wisconsin State Assembly